Chitinimonas taiwanensis is a Gram-negative, chitinolytic, catalase- and oxidase-positive motile bacterium with a single flagellum of the genus Chitinimonas and the family of Burkholderiaceae which was isolated from the surface of a freshwater pond for shrimp (Macrobrachium rosenbergii) in Pingtung City in southern Taiwan.

References

External links
Type strain of Chitinimonas taiwanensis at BacDive -  the Bacterial Diversity Metadatabase

Burkholderiaceae
Bacteria described in 2004